Stefan Dechant is an American art director and production designer. He was nominated for an Academy Award in the category Best Production Design for the film The Tragedy of Macbeth.

Filmography 
 Kong: Skull Island (2017)
 Pacific Rim: Uprising (2018)
 Welcome to Marwen (2018)
 The Call of the Wild (2020)
 The Tragedy of Macbeth (2021; co-nominated with Nancy Haigh)
 Pinocchio (2022) 
 Rebel Moon (TBA)

References

External links 
 

Living people
Place of birth missing (living people)
Year of birth missing (living people)
American art directors
American production designers